Hagemeister Park was the name of a now defunct park in Green Bay, Wisconsin that was the home of the Green Bay Packers from their founding in 1919 and their first two seasons playing in the National Football League, 1921 and 1922.

History

Use and facilities
Owned by Hagemeister brewery, the park was located on the northern end of Washington Park (now Johannes Park). It was a classic sandlot, located near Baird and Walnut Streets, adjacent to the East River. The playing field was roped off from the spectators' standing area. There were no ushers, band, or public address system. There also were no gates, since there was not a fence. Spectators would jump off the streetcar and walk to the sideline to watch. Fans who drove to the game could park their cars about ten yards behind the ropes. Fans often sat in their cars or on top of them, although most stood on the sidelines, following the action up and down the field. At halftime, the teams adjourned to opposite end zones and discuss tactics for the second half. Spectators would form a ring around the players and join in on the discussions.

George Whitney Calhoun, a writer for the Green Bay Press-Gazette and the club's unofficial press representative, would pass a hat among the spectators for donations.
In 1920, a small section of grandstand was built on one side of the field, with a capacity of a few hundred, and a fee was charged to sit there. In 1921, a portable canvas fence was erected around the entire field, and a regular admission fee was inaugurated.

Removal
Hagemeister Park was torn down in 1923 to make way for the new Green Bay East High School, and the Packers moved their games to Bellevue Park.  They would return to a site just north of the park two years later, at City Stadium.

External links
LambeauField.com page, "Packers Stadium History"

Defunct National Football League venues
Green Bay Packers stadiums
Sports venues in Green Bay, Wisconsin
American football venues in Wisconsin
Demolished sports venues in Wisconsin
Sports venues completed in 1919
1919 establishments in Wisconsin
Sports venues demolished in 1923
1923 disestablishments in Wisconsin
High school football venues in the United States